Naima's Love Song is an album by pianist John Hicks's Quartet featuring Bobby Watson recorded in 1988 and released on the Japanese DIW label.

Reception
The Allmusic review stated "With pristine sound and plenty of Hicks' inspired and vigorous solo work topping things off, Naima's Love Song qualifies as one of the best jazz titles of the '80s".

Track listing
 "Elementary My Dear Watson" (Curtis Lundy) - 9:14   
 "Someday Soon" (Bobby Watson) - 9:12   
 "Soul Eyes" (Mal Waldron) - 7:43   
 "On the One" (Watson) - 7:00   
 "Pent-Up House" (Sonny Rollins) - 3:26   
 "Naima's Love Song" (John Hicks) - 10:23

Personnel
John Hicks - piano
Bobby Watson - alto saxophone
Curtis Lundy - bass
Victor Lewis  - drums

References

John Hicks (jazz pianist) albums
1988 albums
DIW Records albums